The English Electric/BAC Lightning is an aviation book by British military historian and author Bruce Barrymore Halpenny about the English Electric Lightning. It was published by Osprey Publishing as part of their Air Combat series. It was a best seller in Grimsby, the home town of the Lightning.

The author, known for his books on airfields and aircraft, spent nine months researching the Lightnings with the pilots of 5 and 11 Squadrons and Binbrook's own Lightning Training Flight. To gather information for the book, the author talked to men like, Sqdn Ldr Dave Carden (with 3,000 plus hours, the most experienced Lightning pilot in the world) and fellow pilots and ground staff.

The book itself gives an insight into the workings of RAF Binbrook, its Lightnings, and the men that fly and maintain them. Sqdn Ldr Dave Carden takes the reader on a typically "hair-raising mission", while another section is devoted to a pilot's experiences when his aircraft caught fire and crashed into the sea off Flamborough Head in 1981. It also deals with the Quick Reaction Alert shed, where two fully armed Lightnings and their pilots were on constant standby to intercept Russian aircraft which used to sometimes fly to within 100 miles of Spurn Point.

References

Air force history
History of aviation
Books about the Cold War
1984 non-fiction books
Works by Bruce Barrymore Halpenny
Aviation books